Canningella is an extinct genus of sponge in the family Anthaspidellidae. There are at least four described species in Canningella.

Species
These four species belong to the genus Canningella:
 † Canningella expansa Rigby, 1986
 † Canningella interrupta Rigby, 1986
 † Canningella magnipora Rigby, 1986
 † Canningella obconica Rigby, 1986

References

Tetractinomorpha
Articles created by Qbugbot